Daniel Scott Morgan (born February 2, 1964) is a former American football guard. He played two games for the New York Giants in 1987. He played college football at Penn State University.

References 

1964 births
Living people
American football offensive guards
Penn State Nittany Lions football players
New York Giants players
National Football League replacement players